VOD refers to video on demand, a system for watching video content such as television.

VOD may also refer to:

 Velocity of detonation, the speed of a shock wave through a detonated explosive
 Veno-occlusive disease, a complication of bone marrow transplantation
 Versant Object Database, a database management system
 Vision of Disorder, a musical group
 Voice of Democracy, Cambodian news outlet
 Voice of Democracy (scholarship)

See also 
 Votes, a people in Russia